Van Buren Charter Township, officially the Charter Township of Van Buren, is a charter township of Wayne County in the U.S. state of Michigan. The population was 28,821 at the 2010 census.

Van Buren Charter Township surrounds the city of Belleville, but the two are separate administrative entities.  Belleville Lake is a principal geographic feature, and the township is also home to Willow Run Airport, which extends into neighboring Ypsilanti Township.

Communities
 Belleville North is an unincorporated community located at  just north of Interstate 94.
The community was settled along the railway line as early as 1864, and it was platted in 1866. Denton had its own post office from February 28, 1870 until October 14, 1933.
Originally settled along the railway line, French Landing had its own post office (named Frenchlanding) from February 25, 1896 until 1919.
The community was settled as early as 1800 and was also referred to as Snow's Landing and Michigan City. Rawsonville had its own post office from November 14, 1838 until October 25, 1895 and again from November 20, 1895 until February 28, 1902.

History
In 1800, settler Henry Snow came and settled on what is now the border with Ypsilanti Township, Washtenaw County which was originally called Snow's Landing.

A settlement of the Huron River received a post office on May 7, 1834, with the name of West Huron and postmaster Scott Vining. The township was formed by the State in 1835 and was soon renamed for Martin Van Buren, then vice president of the US. The post office name was also changed. On November 14, 1838, the Van Buren post office was moved to Rawsonville and assumed that name. On October 25, 1895, the Rawsonville post office was closed, only to reopen on November 20, 1895, only to close again on February 28, 1902.

In 1925, the French Landing Dam and Powerhouse was put in place on the Huron River, placing most of the Rawsonville village under water of the new Belleville Lake.

The only visual sign of the historic community is a historical marker at the intersection Rawsonville and Grove Road.

Geography

Demographics
As of the census of 2000, there were 23,559 people, 9,867 households, and 6,117 families residing in the township. The racial makeup of the township was 82.64% White, 12.03% African American, 0.54% Native American, 1.87% Asian, 0.04% Pacific Islander, 0.51% from other races, and 2.36% from two or more races. Hispanic or Latino people of any race were 2.25% of the population.

There were 9,867 households, out of which 29.8% had children under the age of 18 living with them, 45.5% were married couples living together, 11.7% had a female householder with no husband present, and 38.0% were non-families. 29.1% of all households were made up of individuals, and 3.6% had someone living alone who was 65 years of age or older. The average household size was 2.38 and the average family size was 2.96.

In the township the population was spread out, with 23.9% under the age of 18, 11.0% from 18 to 24, 36.2% from 25 to 44, 22.2% from 45 to 64, and 6.6% who were 65 years of age or older. The median age was 32 years. For every 100 females, there were 101.7 males. For every 100 females age 18 and over, there were 99.8 males.

The median income for a household in the township was $50,984, and the median income for a family was $60,561. Males had a median income of $44,867 versus $30,299 for females. The per capita income for the township was $24,820. About 4.4% of families and 6.3% of the population were below the poverty line, including 7.5% of those under age 18 and 6.1% of those age 65 or over.

Transportation

Highways

Airport
 Willow Run Airport

Economy
Auto parts maker Visteon is based in Van Buren Township. A factory for electric vehicle  lithium iron phosphate batteries is under construction.

USA Jet Airlines has its headquarters on the grounds of Willow Run Airport and in the township.

Gallery

References

Sources

External links
Van Buren Charter Township

Townships in Wayne County, Michigan
Charter townships in Michigan
Populated places established in 1835
1835 establishments in Michigan Territory